Zasulich is a surname. Notable people with the surname include:

Mikhail Zasulich (1843–1910), Imperial Russian Army general
Vera Zasulich (1849–1919), Russian Menshevik writer and revolutionary